Erynnis tristis, commonly known as the mournful duskywing, is a species of spread-wing skipper in the butterfly family Hesperiidae. It is found in Central America, North America, and South America. It is mottled brown with a white fringe on the hind wings. It appears similar to the funereal duskywing, but the mournful duskywing is more likely to appear in urban areas. The larva feeds on young oaks while adults nectar from a variety of wild and garden flowers.

Subspecies
These three subspecies belong to the species Erynnis tristis:
 Erynnis tristis pattersoni Burns, 1964
 Erynnis tristis tatius (W. H. Edwards, 1883)
 Erynnis tristis tristis (Boisduval, 1852)

References

Further reading

External links

 

Erynnis
Articles created by Qbugbot
Butterflies described in 1852